Shri Shivaji Mandir is a theatre auditorium located in Dadar, Mumbai, India. Opened on 3 May 1965 as the first closed auditorium in Dadar, the theater remains a landmark. The theatre has recently undergone renovations and is set to reopen its doors to the public on April 30th, 2022.

References

Theatres in Mumbai
Auditoriums in India